West Midlands bus route 360 was a 31-mile route that circumnavigated Coventry. Operated by Travel de Courcey, it was the longest urban bus route in Europe.

History
Route 360 commenced operating on 9 June 2013 replacing routes 701 and 801. It operated in both clockwise and anti-clockwise directions as routes 360C and 360A.

It ceased on 23 July 2016, and was replaced by three routes:
43: University of Warwick to Eastern Green
60: University of Warwick to Arena Park Shopping Centre via Coventry & Warwickshire University Hospital
61: Allesley Park to Arena Park Shopping Centre

Route
Route 360 operated via these primary locations:
University Hospital Coventry
Willenhall
Jaguar Land Rover, Whitley
University of Warwick
Tile Hill station 
Whoberley
Whitmore Park
Ricoh Arena
Arena Park Shopping Centre

References

External links
Google map

360